Zhonghe is a town in Danzhou city, northwestern Hainan province, China. , it administers Zhonghe Residential Community and the following 11 villages:
Gaodi Village
Shuijing Village
Huanlong Village
Heping Village
Shanchun Village
Lingchun Village
Hengshan Village
Wuli Village
Qili Village
Chang Village
Huangjiang Village

See also
List of township-level divisions of Hainan

References

Township-level divisions of Hainan
Danzhou